is a town located in Kitakatsuragi District, Nara Prefecture, Japan.  It served as Japan's temporary capital from 640-642 AD, the Kudara Palace.  Kudara is a reference to the Korean kingdom of Baekje and "Koryo" is a reference to Korea. However, the kanji making up the town's name literally translate to 'many tombs', as the town has one of the highest concentrations of kofun in Japan.

Koryo has two distinct districts, Mamigaoka and Kasa. Mamigaoka is a relatively new neighborhood that houses many shops and restaurants. It is much more affluent than Kasa, which is sometimes referred to as 'Old Town'. Kasa is primarily agricultural, though it also has a strong sock-making industry. Koryo produces 40% of Japan's socks.

As of March 2017, the town has a population of 35,021 and a density of 2,100 persons per km². The total area is 16.34 km². The town will be celebrating its 60th anniversary in 2015.

Notable people from Kōryō
Tadahiro Nomura, one of the most famous judo competitors in Japan
Toyokazu Nomura, retired judoka

References

External links

 Kōryō official website 

Towns in Nara Prefecture
Former capitals of Japan